Schilde is a municipality located in the Belgian province of Antwerp. In 2021, Schilde had a total population of 19,925. The total area is 35.99 km². It has one of the highest per capita income levels in Flanders.

References

External links
 
  

 
Municipalities of Antwerp Province
Populated places in Antwerp Province